The Crusaders (formerly Canterbury Crusaders and BNZ Crusaders due to sponsorship by the Bank of New Zealand) are a New Zealand professional rugby union team based in Christchurch, who compete in the Super Rugby competition. They are the most successful team in the competition's history and have won 11 titles (1998, 1999, 2000, 2002, 2005, 2006, 2008, 2017, 2018, 2019 and 2022), as well as two regionalised titles in 2020 and 2021.

Formed in 1996 to represent the upper South Island of New Zealand in the Super 12, the Crusaders represent the Buller, Canterbury, Mid-Canterbury, South Canterbury, Tasman and West Coast provincial Rugby Unions. Their main home ground since 2012 is Rugby League Park (known for sponsorship reasons as Orangetheory Stadium). They formerly played out of Lancaster Park prior to it being damaged beyond repair in the 2011 Christchurch earthquake.

The Crusaders struggled in the first season of the Super 12, 1996, finishing last. Their performance improved in 1997 and the team finished sixth (out of twelve teams). The team went on to win three titles from 1998 to 2000 despite each final being played away from home. They again won the competition in 2002 after going through the season unbeaten. In the following two seasons, they again reached the final, although they were beaten on both occasions. 2005 was the last season of the Super 12 before its expansion. After finishing top of the table in that season, the Crusaders went on to host the final in which they defeated the Waratahs. As a result of winning their fifth Super 12 title, the Crusaders were given the trophy to keep. In 2006, the Crusaders hosted the Hurricanes in the inaugural Super 14 final and won 19–12. In 2008 the Crusaders hosted the final at AMI Stadium against the Waratahs, and won the match 20–12 to claim their seventh title. Their eighth championship came in 2017 against the Lions. The Crusaders hosted the Lions in the 2018 final and won 37–18, securing their ninth title. The Crusaders won their tenth Super Rugby title at home against Jaguares in 2019. The Crusaders have won their 11th and 12th title in both editions of Super Rugby Aotearoa in 2020 and 2021. They have won their 13th title(Their 11th Full Super Rugby Title), by winning the inaugural Super Rugby Pacific Grand Final in 2022.

The Crusaders have been led by only three CEOs throughout their 27-Year history; former New Zealand Rugby CEO Steve Tew, Hamish Riach and incumbent Colin Mansbridge.

History

Beginnings: 1996–1997
The Crusaders franchise was created as one of five New Zealand teams in the Super 12. Originally named the Canterbury Crusaders, the Crusaders' franchise area encompassed the upper South Island of New Zealand (see Super Rugby franchise areas), and was formed from the Buller, Canterbury, Marlborough, Mid-Canterbury, Nelson Bays, South Canterbury, and West Coast rugby unions. The original Crusaders team of 1996 was captained by All Blacks prop Richard Loe and coached by Vance Stewart. The Crusaders struggled in the inaugural season and finished bottom of the table with only two wins. Their eight losses included a 49–18 loss to the Blues and a 52–16 loss to the Queensland Reds. And the First ever tour was a pre-visit to South Africa prior start of Super 12.

The following season saw a change in captain and coach, with Todd Blackadder succeeding Loe as captain and Wayne Smith taking over as coach. With five wins, the team finished the round-robin stage in sixth place. The improvement was particularly illustrated by the Crusaders' 29–28 loss to the defending champions, the Blues, which contrasted with their 49–18 loss the previous season. (The Blues also went on to win the 1997 title). During this loss, Leon MacDonald was taken out with a shoulder charge by Robin Brooke. While the Crusaders attempted to get MacDonald back on the field, the Blues scored two tries, including one by Brooke, who was later suspended for two weeks for the shoulder charge. In their last game of 1997, the Crusaders beat the Queensland Reds 48–3 at Lancaster Park, now known as AMI Stadium.

Hat trick: 1998–2000
The Crusaders won their first title in 1998, despite starting the season with three losses in their first four games. They finished the round-robin by winning their last seven games, culminating in a last-round win over the Coastal Sharks (now the ) that gave them second place in the round-robin phase of the competition. Their second-placing allowed them to host their semi-final at Lancaster Park, where they won the match 36–32 against the Coastal Sharks.

In the final at Eden Park, the Crusaders faced the Blues, who were heavy favourites. According to Crusaders' hooker Mark Hammett, "If we'd been polled in that week, and had to give an honest answer, most of the boys, deep down, would probably have thought that the Blues would beat us." The Crusaders were ahead 3–0 at half time, but the Blues scored first after half time to take a 10–3 lead after 53 minutes. After Crusader Norm Maxwell scored a try, the game was tied 10 all. Then, after a penalty each, the two teams were tied 13 all with one minute of regulation time remaining. At that moment, Andrew Mehrtens chipped the ball for James Kerr to run onto and score, giving the Crusaders a 20–13 win after the try was converted. The ten points scored by Andrew Mehrtens in the final contributed to his total of 206 points for the season − a record for the Super 12. Upon the Crusaders' return to Christchurch, they were given a parade through the city that drew 100,000 people.

The 1999 season was equally successful for the Crusaders despite struggling to make the play-offs in fourth place after winning their last four round-robin matches. They defeated the favoured Queensland Reds (who had finished top in the round-robin) in their semi-final to advance to the final against the Otago Highlanders (since renamed the Highlanders). The all-South Island final in Dunedin was promoted as "the party at Tony Brown's house" after Highlanders first five-eighths Tony Brown. Again playing away from home, the Crusaders won 24–19. The decisive try of the match was scored by Crusaders winger Afato So'oalo when he chipped the ball, then out-sprinted All Blacks winger Jeff Wilson to collect the ball and score.

Following the All Blacks' semi-final loss in the 1999 Rugby World Cup, Wayne Smith succeeded John Hart as All Blacks coach. Crusaders manager Robbie Deans replaced Smith as Crusaders coach. In Deans' first year in charge, the Crusaders won their third title in a row − a feat that would be repeated in the 2017-2018-2019 seasons. The Crusaders finished second in the round-robin, earning them the right to host a semi-final in which they faced the Highlanders at Jade Stadium. Two tries in the final 20 minutes by Marika Vunibaka helped the Crusaders to a 37–15 win. The 2000 Super 12 Final was played against the Brumbies in Canberra, Australia, where the weather for the final was icy, with sleet and snow. The game was low-scoring, with only one try each. Four penalties by Mehrtens gave the Crusaders a 12–6 half time lead. Following a Brumbies penalty four minutes from time, the Brumbies led 19–17. However, the Crusaders were awarded a penalty from the resulting kick-off, and after Mehrtens converted the penalty, the Crusaders went on to win the game 20–19.

Development of a legacy: 2001–2005

After winning three consecutive Super 12 titles, the Crusaders finished tenth in 2001 – their worst finish since 1996. The season was the last for captain Todd Blackadder before he left to play for Edinburgh in Scotland.

The Crusaders bounced back dramatically in 2002 when they went through the Super 12 season unbeaten, achieving their fourth title. Although the Crusaders won all eleven of their round-robin matches, six of them were won by a margin of seven points or less. Their eleven round-robin games also included a record 96–19 win over the Waratahs in the final match of the round-robin stage, which was especially noteworthy given that both teams finished at the top of the table.

The Crusaders met the Highlanders in their 2002 semi-final, which they eventually won 34–23 after being ahead 18–6 at half time. The following week, they faced the Brumbies in the first final to be hosted at Jade Stadium. The Brumbies trailed 11–3 after the first half, having had only 30 per cent possession. Although the Brumbies closed the gap to 14–13 with eight minutes to go, the Crusaders held on and steadied to win 31–13 with a last-minute try to Caleb Ralph. The season was their first under the captaincy of Reuben Thorne, who went on to captain the All Blacks until the end of the 2003 Rugby World Cup.

The Crusaders' winning run finally came to an end when they were beaten 39–5 by the Blues in the third round of the 2003 Super 12 season. Although their 15-match unbeaten streak had ended, Richie McCaw said of the loss, "...in some ways it was almost a relief. We'd finally been beaten, the run was over, so people could stop talking about it and we could get on with playing it week by week." The Crusaders recovered to finish second on the table with eight wins. They hosted a semi-final against the Hurricanes, who were coached by Colin Cooper, a former assistant coach for the Crusaders. Despite this inside knowledge of the team by the Wellington coach, the Crusaders won the match 39–16. In the final, the Crusaders met the Blues, another team coached by a former Crusaders assistant coach, Peter Sloane. Hooker Mark Hammett scored two tries to give the Crusaders a 10–6 lead at half-time. The Blues hit back to lead 21–10 with ten minutes to go. The Crusaders managed another converted try, but it was not enough, and the Blues won 21–17.

The Crusaders' 2004 season began with two losses: first to the Waratahs, then to the Blues. They recovered to again finish second on the table with seven wins. They played the Stormers at Jade Stadium in their semi-final, and won 27–16. They met the Brumbies at Canberra Stadium in a replay of the 2000 final. The Brumbies dominated in the final, scoring 33 unanswered points in the first 19 minutes. The Crusaders managed to salvage some pride by narrowing the loss to a 47–38 finish.

The 2005 season started with a repeat of the previous year's final: a Brumbies victory over the Crusaders in Canberra. There was a win the following week at home over the Chiefs, followed by a win over the Reds at Trafalgar Park. Although there was a 35–20 loss to the Bulls after Crusaders captain Richie McCaw was knocked unconscious, they eventually finished the regular season top of the table. McCaw returned from his five weeks on the sideline to lead the Crusaders in their semi-final victory over the Hurricanes. They faced the Waratahs in the final at Jade Stadium. 
Leading 14–6 at halftime, the Crusaders then moved out to a 29-point lead. Despite three late tries by the Waratahs, the Crusaders won their fifth title with a 35–20 win.

As a reward for their seventh finals appearance and fifth title, the Crusaders were allowed to keep the Super 12 trophy. After the 2005 season, the franchise saw the departure of stalwarts Andrew Mehrtens and Justin Marshall, both of whom had played for the team since its formation in 1996.

Super 14: 2006–2010

In 2006, the Super 12 expanded to form the Super 14 when the Western Force from Perth, Australia, and the Cheetahs from the Free State and Northern Cape Provinces, South Africa joined the competition. An unbeaten run of sixteen matches was nearly halted when the Crusaders drew with the Western Force in Perth in round eleven. The following week, the unbeaten run was ended when the Crusaders lost to the Stormers in Cape Town. That loss was their only one of the year, as they finished top of the table with eleven wins. After beating the Bulls in their semi-final, the Crusaders faced the Hurricanes in the final at Jade Stadium that was played in a thick fog, causing poor visibility. Sections of the crowd could not see the field, and many spectators left during the match. The scorers were tied 9–9 going into the game's last 20 minutes. The Crusaders' Casey Laulala then scored the game's only try before the match finished 19–12.

In the 2007 Super 14 season, seven Crusaders players missed the first seven rounds of the competition to participate in an All Black "conditioning programme". The conditioning programme was part of the All Blacks' 2007 Rugby World Cup preparations; 22 players were selected for the programme. The Crusaders' seven players in the programme was more than any other New Zealand Super 14 franchise. The Crusaders players were Chris Jack, Richie McCaw, Greg Somerville, Reuben Thorne, Dan Carter, Leon MacDonald, and Aaron Mauger. All but one of the seven returned to play for the Crusaders in their eighth round match against the Stormers (Greg Somerville did not return due to injury). The Crusaders climbed to second on the table before defeating the Western Force 53–0 at Jade Stadium in the tenth round. The victory over the Force was the one hundredth Super rugby win for the Crusaders – the first franchise to reach the milestone.

The Crusaders were top of the table going into the last round of the Super 14 before the play-offs. To guarantee a home semi-final they needed to defeat the Chiefs at Jade Stadium. The Chiefs won 30–24 – and ended the Crusaders 26 game winning streak at home. As the Bulls defeated the Reds 92–3 in the same round, they overtook the Crusaders to finish second in the round robin. The Crusaders then travelled to Pretoria to face the Bulls in their semi-final where they lost 27–12.

The 2008 season was another highly successful one for the Crusaders. After finishing top of the table at the end of the last round, they comfortably defeated the Hurricanes 33–22 in the semi-final, and went on to beat the Waratahs in the final 20–12. It was a fitting way to send off long-serving coach Robbie Deans before he departed to coach Australia. It was also the last game for Crusaders stalwarts Caleb Ralph and former captain Reuben Thorne. In July that year former captain Todd Blackadder was appointed Crusaders coach, and his former teammates Mark Hammett and Daryl Gibson were appointed as assistants.

The 2009 season started with a sole win and a draw from the Crusaders' first five matches; this included a 6–0 loss to the Highlanders. The side found its feet later in the season, and won key away games which ultimately saw them finish in fourth place on the table – just ahead of the Waratahs. Both the Crusaders and Waratahs finished the season with 41 competition points, but the Crusaders advanced through to the semi-finals due to a greater 'points for and against' difference.

The Crusaders lost their semi-final to the Bulls 36–23 at Loftus Versfeld, Pretoria in front of a capacity 52,000 crowd. The Bulls went on to win the 2009 Super 14 title beating the Chiefs 61–17. Statistically, the Crusaders had the best defensive record of the 2009 competition – conceding just 198 points. However, points for, and total tries scored was the second lowest in the competition with just 231 points and 27 tries.

In 2010 the Crusaders had a very good start to the season before a poor finish with three losses in four games caused them to have to travel to Orlando Stadium, Soweto to face the Bulls. They lost the semi-final 39–24.

2011–2016
The 2011 season had a minor hiccup at the very beginning with a two-point loss to the Blues. Their second round match against the Hurricanes was cancelled, and match declared a draw after the Christchurch earthquake on 22 February which caused 182 deaths. In their first match after the earthquake they played the Waratahs, a team that had only conceded six points in their previous two games. The Crusaders triumphed 33–18 in a convincing display in front of a sold-out stadium. They next played the Brumbies and brushed them aside in a 52–10 demolition. They next played the Highlanders who had previously only lost one match in the season, to the undefeated and table-topping Stormers. The Crusaders won comfortably 44–13 in Dunedin. The next team they played, the Sharks, had like the Highlanders previously only lost one match in the season before the Crusaders won 44–28 at Twickenham for a one-off match due to earthquake damage at their own ground. They played the second match in a sell-out crowd at Fraser Park in Timaru against the Bulls winning 27–0. Round 9 they played the Chiefs in Mt Maunganui and gained four tries winning 34–16 with Richie McCaw returning after eight weeks off with injury. The Crusaders lost the final at the Suncorp Stadium to the Queensland Reds. Will Genia scored a crucial try for the Reds to help them to an 18–13 win.

The 2012 season, the first in the new home ground of Christchurch Stadium, saw the Crusaders again reach the playoffs. However, they were defeated by the (eventual champion) Chiefs in the semi-final.

2017–present

In 2017, Scott Robertson took over as head coach. The Crusaders lost 12–3 to the British & Irish Lions at Christchurch, during the Lions tour to New Zealand.

The team went on to win their 8th Super Rugby title, defeating the  25–17 in the final on 5 August 2017 at Ellis Park Stadium in Johannesburg.

In 2018, the Crusaders again played the Lions in the final. This time they won 37–18 at home to capture their ninth title.

After 7 rounds of the 2020 Super Rugby season, the Crusaders were leading the NZ conference and were in 3rd overall (behind the Sharks and Brumbies) but the COVID-19 pandemic stopped the competition after the 7th round. However, in June 2020 a domestic Super Rugby competition started called Super Rugby Aotearoa. The Crusaders won the overall title in Super Rugby Aotearoa 2020, winning 7 out of 8 games. Their 36-game win streak at Orangetheory Stadium was however broken by the Hurricanes in Round 7, who defeated them 32–34. They also dropped the physical trophy in post-match celebrations, chipping the pounamu mere on it.

The Crusaders returned to Super Rugby Aotearoa in 2021 and made it all the way to the final, despite losses to the Highlanders (12–33) and the Chiefs (26–25) where they faced the Chiefs and won their 5th consecutive title in a 24–13 win. Following that, they went into the Super Rugby Trans Tasman competition and beat the Brumbies (31-29), Reds (28-63), Waratahs (28-54), Force (29-21) and Rebels (26-52) but just came up short on points needed to be able to make the final.

Name and colours

According to the club, the Crusaders' name was chosen to reflect the "crusading nature of Canterbury rugby". A potential name was also the Plainsmen; however, this was not chosen, as "Crusaders" recalled the English heritage of the city of Christchurch.

The club adopted Canterbury's traditional sporting colours of red and black, as worn by Canterbury.

In the aftermath of the 15 March 2019 Christchurch mosque shootings at Al Noor Mosque and Linwood Islamic Centre in Christchurch, New Zealand which killed 51 people and injured 50 more by Australia-born Brenton Harrison Tarrant, the Crusaders considered the idea changing the team name because the symbolism and imagery was considered to be "offensive to some in the community due to its association with the religious Crusades between Christians and Muslims" according to New Zealand Rugby Executive Steve Tew but ultimately though it was kept and remained unchanged for the 2020 season. The Crusaders management led by Colin Mansbridge, revealed a new logo to replace the knight and sword in late 2019.

Franchise area
 

The Crusaders' franchise area consists of the regions controlled by the Buller, Canterbury, Mid-Canterbury, South Canterbury, Tasman and West Coast rugby unions. Before 2006, when the NPC was reorganised, Canterbury was the only union playing division one (now Bunnings NPC) within the Crusaders' catchment. As a result, the majority of Crusaders players were also listed with Canterbury. Today, the Crusaders' catchment contains two Bunnings NPC sides – Canterbury and Tasman.

Grounds
The Crusaders' main home ground was the 36,000-capacity AMI Stadium in Christchurch. However, they stopped playing there during the 2011 Super Rugby season due to damage inflicted by the February Christchurch earthquake. The Crusaders usually took one game each year to another part of the franchise area, most often when the New Zealand cricket team was playing at AMI Stadium. Previous venues included Trafalgar Park in Nelson, and Fraser Park in Timaru.

With AMI Stadium still out of commission, the Crusaders adopted Rugby League Park (which has been renamed Christchurch Stadium temporarily) in Addington as their home ground for that and future seasons to recentralise their games in one location as opposed to the road show that was the 2011 season. The ground had a limited makeover, taking it to an 18,600 capacity stadium and bringing its facilities to the minimum standards required by the Super Rugby competition.

The Crusaders' management proposed playing a 2005 regular season match in Melbourne when Jade Stadium was unavailable. Although five of the seven unions within the Crusaders region supported having the regular season game in Melbourne, the New Zealand Rugby Union (NZRU) vetoed the proposal. In 2006, the Crusaders did play a pre-season match in Melbourne against the Western Force at Olympic Park Stadium. They did the same in the 2008 preseason as well, also against the Force.

Due to the 2011 earthquake, the Crusaders played four games at Trafalgar Park, and two in Timaru during their 2011 season. They also played a "home" game in Wellington in Round 18 against Hurricanes, and a special home match against the Sharks at Twickenham in London. The London match was a fundraiser for earthquake relief, and was the first Super Rugby match ever contested outside of the three participating countries. In the first 30 hours of ticket sales, over 30,000 were purchased; a spokesman for United Ticketmaster indicated that the response was the strongest he had experienced for a rugby match outside of internationals.

Development team
The Crusaders have fielded a development team in competitions such as the Pacific Rugby Cup and in matches against other representative teams for several seasons. Known as the Crusaders Development XV or Crusaders Knights, the squad is selected from the best emerging rugby talent in the Crusaders catchment area and is composed of Crusaders contracted players, wider training group members, under 20s, and selected club players.

Records and achievements

Honours
 Super Rugby Champions (11)
1998, 1999, 2000, 2002, 2005, 2006, 2008, 2017, 2018, 2019, 2022
 Super Rugby Aotearoa Champions (2)
2020, 2021
 Super Rugby Runners-up (4)
2003, 2004, 2011,  2014
 Super Rugby Playoff Appearances (5)
2007, 2009, 2010, 2012, 2013
 New Zealand Conference Champions (5)
2011, 2014, 2017, 2018, 2019

Season standings 
{| class="wikitable" style="font-size:90%"
|align="center" bgcolor="#FFE6BD"|Super 12
|align="center" bgcolor="#FFCCCC"|Super 14
|align="center" bgcolor="#FFA6AA"|Super Rugby
|}

{| class="wikitable"
|-border=1 cellpadding=5 cellspacing=0
! width="20"|Season
! width="20"|Pos
! width="20"|Pld
! width="20"|W
! width="20"|D
! width="20"|L
! width="20"|F
! width="20"|A
! width="25"|+/-
! width="20"|BP
! width="20"|Pts
! width="250"|Notes
|- align=center
|align=left bgcolor="#FFE6BD"|1996
|align=left bgcolor="#FFE6BD"|12th
|bgcolor="#FFE6BD"|11||bgcolor="#FFE6BD"|2||bgcolor="#FFE6BD"|1||bgcolor="#FFE6BD"|8||bgcolor="#FFE6BD"|234||bgcolor="#FFE6BD"|378||bgcolor="#FFE6BD"|-144||bgcolor="#FFE6BD"|3||bgcolor="#FFE6BD"|13||bgcolor="#FFE6BD"|
|- align=center
|align=left bgcolor="#FFE6BD"|1997
|align=left bgcolor="#FFE6BD"|6th
|bgcolor="#FFE6BD"|11||bgcolor="#FFE6BD"|5||bgcolor="#FFE6BD"|1||bgcolor="#FFE6BD"|5||bgcolor="#FFE6BD"|272||bgcolor="#FFE6BD"|235||bgcolor="#FFE6BD"|+37||bgcolor="#FFE6BD"|4||bgcolor="#FFE6BD"|26||bgcolor="#FFE6BD"|
|- align=center
|align=left bgcolor="#FFE6BD"|1998
|align=left bgcolor="#FFE6BD"|1st
|bgcolor="#FFE6BD"|11||bgcolor="#FFE6BD"|8||bgcolor="#FFE6BD"|0||bgcolor="#FFE6BD"|3||bgcolor="#FFE6BD"|340||bgcolor="#FFE6BD"|260||bgcolor="#FFE6BD"|+80||bgcolor="#FFE6BD"|9||bgcolor="#FFE6BD"|41||align=left bgcolor="#FFE6BD"|Defeated the Blues in the final.
|- align=center
|align=left bgcolor="#FFE6BD"|1999
|align=left bgcolor="#FFE6BD"|1st
|bgcolor="#FFE6BD"|11||bgcolor="#FFE6BD"|7||bgcolor="#FFE6BD"|1||bgcolor="#FFE6BD"|3||bgcolor="#FFE6BD"|324||bgcolor="#FFE6BD"|262||bgcolor="#FFE6BD"|+62||bgcolor="#FFE6BD"|3||bgcolor="#FFE6BD"|33||align=left bgcolor="#FFE6BD"|Defeated the Highlanders in the final.
|- align=center
|align=left bgcolor="#FFE6BD"|2000
|align=left bgcolor="#FFE6BD"|1st
|bgcolor="#FFE6BD"|11||bgcolor="#FFE6BD"|8||bgcolor="#FFE6BD"|0||bgcolor="#FFE6BD"|3||bgcolor="#FFE6BD"|369||bgcolor="#FFE6BD"|293||bgcolor="#FFE6BD"|+76||bgcolor="#FFE6BD"|7||bgcolor="#FFE6BD"|39||align=left bgcolor="#FFE6BD"|Defeated the Brumbies in the final.
|- align=center
|align=left bgcolor="#FFE6BD"|2001
|align=left bgcolor="#FFE6BD"|10th
|bgcolor="#FFE6BD"|11||bgcolor="#FFE6BD"|4||bgcolor="#FFE6BD"|0||bgcolor="#FFE6BD"|7||bgcolor="#FFE6BD"|307||bgcolor="#FFE6BD"|331||bgcolor="#FFE6BD"|-24||bgcolor="#FFE6BD"|7||bgcolor="#FFE6BD"|23||bgcolor="#FFE6BD"|
|- align=center
|align=left bgcolor="#FFE6BD"|2002
|align=left bgcolor="#FFE6BD"|1st
|bgcolor="#FFE6BD"|11||bgcolor="#FFE6BD"|11||bgcolor="#FFE6BD"|0||bgcolor="#FFE6BD"|0||bgcolor="#FFE6BD"|469||bgcolor="#FFE6BD"|264||bgcolor="#FFE6BD"|+205||bgcolor="#FFE6BD"|7||bgcolor="#FFE6BD"|51||align=left bgcolor="#FFE6BD"|Defeated the Brumbies in the final.
|- align=center
|align=left bgcolor="#FFE6BD"|2003
|align=left bgcolor="#FFE6BD"|2nd
|bgcolor="#FFE6BD"|11||bgcolor="#FFE6BD"|8||bgcolor="#FFE6BD"|0||bgcolor="#FFE6BD"|3||bgcolor="#FFE6BD"|358||bgcolor="#FFE6BD"|263||bgcolor="#FFE6BD"|+95||bgcolor="#FFE6BD"|8||bgcolor="#FFE6BD"|40||align=left bgcolor="#FFE6BD"|Lost to the Blues in the final.
|- align=center
|align=left bgcolor="#FFE6BD"|2004
|align=left bgcolor="#FFE6BD"|2nd
|bgcolor="#FFE6BD"|11||bgcolor="#FFE6BD"|7||bgcolor="#FFE6BD"|0||bgcolor="#FFE6BD"|4||bgcolor="#FFE6BD"|345||bgcolor="#FFE6BD"|303||bgcolor="#FFE6BD"|+42||bgcolor="#FFE6BD"|6||bgcolor="#FFE6BD"|34||align=left bgcolor="#FFE6BD"|Lost to the Brumbies in the final.
|- align=center
|align=left bgcolor="#FFE6BD"|2005
|align=left bgcolor="#FFE6BD"|1st
|bgcolor="#FFE6BD"|11||bgcolor="#FFE6BD"|9||bgcolor="#FFE6BD"|0||bgcolor="#FFE6BD"|2||bgcolor="#FFE6BD"|459||bgcolor="#FFE6BD"|281||bgcolor="#FFE6BD"|+178||bgcolor="#FFE6BD"|8||bgcolor="#FFE6BD"|44||align=left bgcolor="#FFE6BD"|Defeated the Waratahs in the final.
|- align=center
|align=left bgcolor="#FFCCCC"|2006
|align=left bgcolor="#FFCCCC"|1st
|bgcolor="#FFCCCC"|13||bgcolor="#FFCCCC"|11||bgcolor="#FFCCCC"|1||bgcolor="#FFCCCC"|1||bgcolor="#FFCCCC"|412||bgcolor="#FFCCCC"|210||bgcolor="#FFCCCC"|+202||bgcolor="#FFCCCC"|5||bgcolor="#FFCCCC"|51||align=left bgcolor="#FFCCCC"|Defeated the Hurricanes in the final.
|- align=center
|align=left bgcolor="#FFCCCC"|2007
|align=left bgcolor="#FFCCCC"|3rd
|bgcolor="#FFCCCC"|13||bgcolor="#FFCCCC"|8||bgcolor="#FFCCCC"|0||bgcolor="#FFCCCC"|5||bgcolor="#FFCCCC"|382||bgcolor="#FFCCCC"|235||bgcolor="#FFCCCC"|+147||bgcolor="#FFCCCC"|10||bgcolor="#FFCCCC"|42||align=left bgcolor="#FFCCCC"|Lost to the Bulls in the semi-final.
|- align=center
|align=left bgcolor="#FFCCCC"|2008
|align=left bgcolor="#FFCCCC"|1st
|bgcolor="#FFCCCC"|13||bgcolor="#FFCCCC"|11||bgcolor="#FFCCCC"|0||bgcolor="#FFCCCC"|2||bgcolor="#FFCCCC"|369||bgcolor="#FFCCCC"|176||bgcolor="#FFCCCC"|+193||bgcolor="#FFCCCC"|8||bgcolor="#FFCCCC"|52||align=left bgcolor="#FFCCCC"|Defeated the Waratahs in the final.
|- align=center
|align=left bgcolor="#FFCCCC"|2009
|align=left bgcolor="#FFCCCC"|4th
|bgcolor="#FFCCCC"|13||bgcolor="#FFCCCC"|8||bgcolor="#FFCCCC"|1||bgcolor="#FFCCCC"|4||bgcolor="#FFCCCC"|231||bgcolor="#FFCCCC"|198||bgcolor="#FFCCCC"|+33||bgcolor="#FFCCCC"|7||bgcolor="#FFCCCC"|41||align=left bgcolor="#FFCCCC"|Lost to the Bulls in the semi-final.
|- align=center
|align=left bgcolor="#FFCCCC"|2010
|align=left bgcolor="#FFCCCC"|4th
|bgcolor="#FFCCCC"|13||bgcolor="#FFCCCC"|8||bgcolor="#FFCCCC"|1||bgcolor="#FFCCCC"|4||bgcolor="#FFCCCC"|388||bgcolor="#FFCCCC"|295||bgcolor="#FFCCCC"|+93||bgcolor="#FFCCCC"|7||bgcolor="#FFCCCC"|41||align=left bgcolor="#FFCCCC"|Lost to the Bulls in the semi-final.
|- align=center
|align=left bgcolor="#FFA6AA"|2011
|align=left bgcolor="#FFA6AA"|2nd
|bgcolor="#FFA6AA"|16||bgcolor="#FFA6AA"|11||bgcolor="#FFA6AA"|1||bgcolor="#FFA6AA"|4||bgcolor="#FFA6AA"|436||bgcolor="#FFA6AA"|273||bgcolor="#FFA6AA"|+163||bgcolor="#FFA6AA"|7||bgcolor="#FFA6AA"|65||align=left bgcolor="#FFA6AA"|Lost to the Reds in the final.
|- align=center
|align=left bgcolor="#FFA6AA"|2012
|align=left bgcolor="#FFA6AA"|4th
|bgcolor="#FFA6AA"|16||bgcolor="#FFA6AA"|11||bgcolor="#FFA6AA"|0||bgcolor="#FFA6AA"|5||bgcolor="#FFA6AA"|485||bgcolor="#FFA6AA"|343||bgcolor="#FFA6AA"|+142||bgcolor="#FFA6AA"|9||bgcolor="#FFA6AA"|61||align=left bgcolor="#FFA6AA"|Lost to the Chiefs in the semi-final.
|- align=center
|align=left bgcolor="#FFA6AA"|2013
|align=left bgcolor="#FFA6AA"|4th
|bgcolor="#FFA6AA"|16||bgcolor="#FFA6AA"|11||bgcolor="#FFA6AA"|0||bgcolor="#FFA6AA"|5||bgcolor="#FFA6AA"|446||bgcolor="#FFA6AA"|307||bgcolor="#FFA6AA"|+139||bgcolor="#FFA6AA"|8||bgcolor="#FFA6AA"|60||align=left bgcolor="#FFA6AA"|Lost to the Chiefs in the semi-final.
|- align=center
|align=left bgcolor="#FFA6AA"|2014
|align=left bgcolor="#FFA6AA"|2nd
|bgcolor="#FFA6AA"|16||bgcolor="#FFA6AA"|11||bgcolor="#FFA6AA"|0||bgcolor="#FFA6AA"|5||bgcolor="#FFA6AA"|445||bgcolor="#FFA6AA"|322||bgcolor="#FFA6AA"|+123||bgcolor="#FFA6AA"|7||bgcolor="#FFA6AA"|51||align=left bgcolor="#FFA6AA"|Lost to the Waratahs in the final.
|- align=center
|align=left bgcolor="#FFA6AA"|2015
|align=left bgcolor="#FFA6AA"|7th
|bgcolor="#FFA6AA"|16||bgcolor="#FFA6AA"|9||bgcolor="#FFA6AA"|0||bgcolor="#FFA6AA"|7||bgcolor="#FFA6AA"|481||bgcolor="#FFA6AA"|338||bgcolor="#FFA6AA"|+143||bgcolor="#FFA6AA"|10||bgcolor="#FFA6AA"|46||bgcolor="#FFA6AA"|
|- align=center
|align=left bgcolor="#FFA6AA"|2016
|align=left bgcolor="#FFA6AA"|7th
|bgcolor="#FFA6AA"|15||bgcolor="#FFA6AA"|11||bgcolor="#FFA6AA"|0||bgcolor="#FFA6AA"|4||bgcolor="#FFA6AA"|487||bgcolor="#FFA6AA"|317||bgcolor="#FFA6AA"|+170||bgcolor="#FFA6AA"|6||bgcolor="#FFA6AA"|50||align=left bgcolor="#FFA6AA"|Lost to the Lions in the quarter-final.
|- align=center
|align=left bgcolor="#FFA6AA"|2017
|align=left bgcolor="#FFA6AA"|1st
|bgcolor="#FFA6AA"|15||bgcolor="#FFA6AA"|14||bgcolor="#FFA6AA"|0||bgcolor="#FFA6AA"|1||bgcolor="#FFA6AA"|544||bgcolor="#FFA6AA"|303||bgcolor="#FFA6AA"|+241||bgcolor="#FFA6AA"|7||bgcolor="#FFA6AA"|63||align=left bgcolor="#FFA6AA"|Defeated the Lions in the final.
|- align=center
|align=left bgcolor="#FFA6AA"|2018
|align=left bgcolor="#FFA6AA"|1st
|bgcolor="#FFA6AA"|16||bgcolor="#FFA6AA"|14||bgcolor="#FFA6AA"|0||bgcolor="#FFA6AA"|2||bgcolor="#FFA6AA"|542||bgcolor="#FFA6AA"|295||bgcolor="#FFA6AA"|+247||bgcolor="#FFA6AA"|7||bgcolor="#FFA6AA"|63||align=left bgcolor="#FFA6AA"|Defeated the Lions in the final.
|- align=center
|align=left bgcolor="#FFA6AA"|2019
|align=left bgcolor="#FFA6AA"|1st
|bgcolor="#FFA6AA"|16||bgcolor="#FFA6AA"|11||bgcolor="#FFA6AA"|3||bgcolor="#FFA6AA"|2||bgcolor="#FFA6AA"|497||bgcolor="#FFA6AA"|257||bgcolor="#FFA6AA"|+240||bgcolor="#FFA6AA"|8||bgcolor="#FFA6AA"|58||align=left bgcolor="#FFA6AA"|Defeated the Jaguares in the final.
|- align=center
|align=left bgcolor="#FFA6AA"|2020
|align=left bgcolor="#FFA6AA"|3rd
|bgcolor="#FFA6AA"|6||bgcolor="#FFA6AA"|5||bgcolor="#FFA6AA"|0||bgcolor="#FFA6AA"|1||bgcolor="#FFA6AA"|189||bgcolor="#FFA6AA"|105||bgcolor="#FFA6AA"|+84||bgcolor="#FFA6AA"|3||bgcolor="#FFA6AA"|23||align=left bgcolor="#FFA6AA"|Season cut short after 7 rounds due to COVID-19 pandemic.
|- align=center
|align=left bgcolor="#FFA6AA"|2020*
|align=left bgcolor="#FFA6AA"|1st
|bgcolor="#FFA6AA"|8||bgcolor="#FFA6AA"|6||bgcolor="#FFA6AA"|1||bgcolor="#FFA6AA"|1||bgcolor="#FFA6AA"|219||bgcolor="#FFA6AA"|148||bgcolor="#FFA6AA"|+71||bgcolor="#FFA6AA"|4||bgcolor="#FFA6AA"|30||align=left bgcolor="#FFA6AA"|Final game called a draw due to COVID-19 lockdowns.
|- align=center
|align=left bgcolor="#FFA6AA"|2021
|align=left bgcolor="#FFA6AA"|1st
|bgcolor="#FFA6AA"|8||bgcolor="#FFA6AA"|6||bgcolor="#FFA6AA"|0||bgcolor="#FFA6AA"|2||bgcolor="#FFA6AA"|237||bgcolor="#FFA6AA"|165||bgcolor="#FFA6AA"|+72||bgcolor="#FFA6AA"|4||bgcolor="#FFA6AA"|28||align=left bgcolor="#FFA6AA"|Defeated the Chiefs in the final
|- align=center
|align=left bgcolor="#FFA6AA"|2021**
|align=left bgcolor="#FFA6AA"|3rd
|bgcolor="#FFA6AA"|5||bgcolor="#FFA6AA"|5||bgcolor="#FFA6AA"|0||bgcolor="#FFA6AA"|0||bgcolor="#FFA6AA"|229||bgcolor="#FFA6AA"|132||bgcolor="#FFA6AA"|+97||bgcolor="#FFA6AA"|3||bgcolor="#FFA6AA"|23||align=left bgcolor="#FFA6AA"|
|- align=center
|align=left bgcolor="#FFA6AA"|2022
|align=left bgcolor="#FFA6AA"|1st
|bgcolor="#FFA6AA"|14||bgcolor="#FFA6AA"|11||bgcolor="#FFA6AA"|0||bgcolor="#FFA6AA"|3||bgcolor="#FFA6AA"|470||bgcolor="#FFA6AA"|268||bgcolor="#FFA6AA"|+202||bgcolor="#FFA6AA"|8||bgcolor="#FFA6AA"|52||align=left bgcolor="#FFA6AA"|Defeated the Blues in the final.
|}

Results per opposition
Crusaders Super Rugby record vs all opponents

Individual records

 Most Points in a career: 1708 (Dan Carter)
 Most Points in a season: 221 (Dan Carter, 2006)
 Most Points in a match: 31 (Tom Taylor, v Stormers, 2012)
 Most Tries in a career: 52 (Caleb Ralph)
 Most Tries in a season: 15 (Rico Gear, 2005)
 Most Tries in a match: 4 (Caleb Ralph, v NSW Waratahs, 2002 / 4, Sean Maitland, v Brumbies, 2011)     
 Most Conversions in a career: 287 (Dan Carter)
 Most Conversions in a season: 41 (Richie Mo’unga, 2016)
 Most Conversions in a match: 13 (Andrew Mehrtens, v NSW Waratahs, 2002)
 Most Penalty goals in a career: 307 (Dan Carter)
 Most Penalty goals in a season: 46 (Colin Slade, 2014)
 Most Penalty goals in a match: 8 (Tom Taylor, v Stormers, 2012)
 Most Dropped goals in a career: 17 (Andrew Mehrtens)
 Most Dropped goals in a season: 4 (Andrew Mehrtens, 1998, 1999, 2002)
 Most Dropped goals in a match: 3 (Andrew Mehrtens, v Highlanders, 1998)
 Most Appearances: 202 (Wyatt Crockett)

Team Records

 Highest Regular Season Placing: 1st (2002, 2005, 2006, 2008)
 Most Wins in a Season: 17 (2017)
 Most Points in a Season: 544 (2017)
 Most Tries in a Season: 77 (2016) 
 Fewest Wins in a Season: 2 (1996)
 Fewest Points in a Season: 231 (2009) 
 Fewest Tries in a Season: 24 (1996)
 Biggest Win: 96–19 (77 point win in 2002 vs. Waratahs – Christchurch)
 Biggest Loss: 52–16 (36 point loss in 1996 vs. Reds – Brisbane)  
 Most points ever scored in a game: 96 (2002 vs. Waratahs – Christchurch)
 Fewest points ever scored in a game: 0 (2009 vs. Highlanders – Dunedin)
 Longest Winning Streak: 16 (2005 vs. Stormers – 2006 vs. Cheetahs) 
 Longest Unbeaten Streak: 17 (2005 vs. Stormers – 2006 vs. Force)
Longest Unbeaten Streak: 19 (2018 vs Bulls – 2019 vs Waratahs with the Highlanders Game March 2019 abandoned)
 Longest Home Winning Streak: 26 (2004 vs. Highlanders – 2007 vs. Hurricanes)
 First to 100 Wins: Round 10, 2007 season (Crusaders defeated the Western Force 53–0)
 First to 200 Wins: Round 16, 2016 season (Crusaders defeated the Rebels 85–26)

All Time Records

 Games played: 319
 Games won: 217 
 Games lost: 95
 Games drawn: 7
 Winning percentage: 68%
 Home Wins: 132 (82%)  
 Away Wins: 85 (53.8%)
 Points for: 9526 
 Points against: 6847
 Tries for: 1072 
 Tries conceded: 740

Playoffs

 Games played: 34
 Games won: 24 
 Games lost: 10
 Games drawn: 0
 Winning percentage: 70.6%
 Home Wins: 18 (100%)  
 Away Wins: 6 (37.5%)
 Points for: 943 
 Points against: 660
 Tries for: 93 
 Tries conceded: 63

(Record updated as of 2017 final)

In addition to winning more Super Rugby titles than any other team, the franchise also holds several competition records, including most points in a game and most tries in a game, both achieved in their 96–19 victory over the Waratahs in 2002. The Crusaders also hold the record for the fewest points scored in a game when they were defeated by the Highlanders 6–0 in 2009. They have also scored the most points (541) and most tries (71) in one season, both achieved in 2005.

Individual players also hold records: Andrew Mehrtens for most points in a Super 12 season (206 in 1998), and Rico Gear for most tries in a season (15 in 2005). Thirteen players have played over 100 games for the franchise: Justin Marshall, Reuben Thorne, Caleb Ralph, Greg Somerville, Leon MacDonald, Richie McCaw, Chris Jack, Dan Carter, Andy Ellis, Kieran Read, Wyatt Crockett, Sam Whitelock and Ryan Crotty they also have three International Rugby Board Players of the Year: Dan Carter (2005), (2012), (2015), Richie McCaw (2006), (2009) and (2010) and Kieran Read (2013)

Current squad

The squad for the 2023 Super Rugby Pacific season is:

List of All Blacks

Due to the success of the Crusaders throughout Super Rugby, many players that have represented the Crusaders have gone on to play international test rugby for the All Blacks. List of All Blacks that have represented the Crusaders:

Notable players

Seventeen players have played over 100 games for the franchise:
Justin Marshall
Reuben Thorne
Caleb Ralph
Corey Flynn
Greg Somerville
Leon MacDonald
Richie McCaw
Chris Jack
Dan Carter, 
Wyatt Crockett
Andy Ellis
Owen Franks
Samuel Whitelock
Ryan Crotty
Jordan Taufua
Matt Todd
Luke Romano
Half-back Justin Marshall was the first player to achieve the feat, playing for the Crusaders between 1996 and 2005. Both Thorne and Ralph achieved the 100-game mark at the same time. However, Ralph had played nine of his matches for other franchises: three for the Chiefs and six for the Blues. Ralph achieved the "100 Crusaders games" feat later that season; remarkably, they were played consecutively. Greg Somerville became the next player to contribute 100 games for the franchise, achieving this in the 2006 semi-final against the Bulls. The first match of the 2008 season was Leon MacDonald's 100th game, and on 11 March 2011 Chris Jack started against the Brumbies to play his 100th match for the Crusaders. The Crusaders also boast three winners of the IRB International Player of the Year Award: Dan Carter (2005, 2012 and 2015), Kieran Read (2013) and Richie McCaw (2006, 2009 and 2010).

1996–2005 Team of the decade 
On the eve of the last Super 12 final in 2005, a panel of experts picked the Crusaders team of the decade, which was published by the Christchurch Press. The experts chosen to select the team were: Tane Norton (former All Blacks captain), Vance Stewart (first Crusaders coach), Dick Tayler (president of supporters club), Bob Schumacher (former Christchurch Press rugby writer) and Tony Smith (Christchurch Press rugby writer).

The most notable omissions from the team were Dan Carter, Richard Loe, and Reuben Thorne. Daniel Carter was omitted due to the strength of Andrew Mehrtens and Aaron Mauger who occupied the first and second five-eighth positions respectively, and because he was regarded as "the star of the next decade". Despite being considered one of Canterbury's best ever props, Richard Loe missed out as he was only in the team for the unsuccessful 1996 season. The former All Black captain Reuben Thorne was omitted due to the quality of players in the lock and blindside flanker positions. The most unlikely inclusion was for Norm Berryman at right wing. Berryman was picked over Marika Vunibaka and Afato So'oalo due to his crucial tries late in the 1998 and 1999 seasons that helped the Crusaders qualify for the semi-finals. The team:

Coaches
The Crusaders were coached in their first season by Vance Stewart, who was assisted by Aussie Mclean. Stewart was replaced by Wayne Smith in 1997; McLean too was replaced, by Peter Sloane. Smith continued as coach until he was appointed All Blacks coach after the 1999 season. Robbie Deans took over the reins for the 2000 season. Deans has had several assistants: in 2000 and 2001 his assistant was Steve Hansen; in 2002, Colin Cooper; in 2003 and 2004, Don Hayes; and in 2005 and 2006, Vern Cotter. Deans' assistant for the 2007 season was former Crusader Mark Hammett. Deans was appointed coach of Australia in December 2007, but was allowed to continue coaching the Crusaders in the 2008 season. Former captain, Todd Blackadder was appointed his successor in July 2008, with Hammett continuing as assistant coach. Hammett was appointed Hurricanes coach from the beginning of the 2011 season, and consequently former prop Dave Hewett was appointed assistant forwards coach. In June 2016, Scott Robertson, former Crusaders player and former Head Coach of the Canterbury National Provincial Team and the New Zealand Under 20 Rugby Team, was announced as the Crusaders Head Coach from 2017 through to 2024.

Head coach
 Scott Robertson

Assistant coaches
 James Marshall (backs)
 Dan Perrin (forwards)
 Tamati Ellison (defence)
 Scott Hansen (assistant coach)

Former coaches and records

Coaches

Notes: Official Super Rugby competition matches only, including finals.

Notes

References

Print sources

External links

 
 

 
New Zealand rugby union teams
Rugby clubs established in 1996
Sport in Canterbury, New Zealand
Crusaders, 2006
Super Rugby teams